Melampsorella is a genus of fungi belonging to the family Pucciniastraceae.

The species of this genus are found in Europe and Northern America.

Species:

Melampsorella betulina 
Melampsorella caryophyllacearum 
Melampsorella itoana 
Melampsorella rigida

References

Pucciniales
Basidiomycota genera
Taxa named by Joseph Schröter